Morice Michael Abraham (born 13 August 2003) is a Tanzanian professional footballer who plays as a midfielder for Serbian SuperLiga club Spartak Subotica.

Club career
Abraham is a former youth academy player of Alliance Mwanza. In September 2021, he signed a four-year contract with Serbian club Spartak Subotica. He made his professional debut for the club on 28 November 2021 in a 3–0 defeat against Red Star Belgrade.

International career
Abraham was captain of Tanzanian squad at 2019 Africa U-17 Cup of Nations.

Career statistics

Club

References

External links
 

2003 births
Living people
Association football midfielders
Tanzanian footballers
Tanzania youth international footballers
Serbian SuperLiga players
FK Spartak Subotica players
Tanzanian expatriate footballers
Expatriate footballers in Serbia